HC SKIF Nizhny Novgorod are a Russian ice hockey team in the Zhenskaya Hockey League (ZhHL). They play in Nizhny Novgorod at the CEC Nagorny, which is also home to Torpedo Nizhny Novgorod of the KHL. SKIF have won the Russian Championship in women's ice hockey twelve times, three more wins than any other team, and won the IIHF European Women's Champions Cup in 2009 and 2015.

The team was founded in Moscow in 1995 as Luzhniki Moscow. They were subsequently known as CSK VVS Moscow (1996–1998), Viking Moscow (1998–2000), and SKIF Moscow (2000–2006). In 2006 the team moved from Moscow to Nizhny Novgorod and were renamed SKIF Nizhny Novgorod.

Team honors

Russian Championship 

  Russian Champion (12): 1996, 1997, 1998, 1999, 2001, 2002, 2003, 2004, 2005, 2008, 2010, 2014
  Runners-up (6): 2000, 2006, 2007, 2009, 2011, 2022

IIHF European Women Champions Cup

  European Champion (2): 2009, 2015
  Runners-up (1): 2004
  Third Place (1): 2005

Players and personnel

2021–22 roster 

Coaching staff and team personnel
 Head coach: Igor Averkin
 Assistant coach: Oleg Namestnikov
 Goaltending coach: Mikhail Vorobyov
 Conditioning coach: Alexei Urazov
 Team manager: Dmitri Beschastnov
 Team doctor: Leonid Pavlovich
 Masseur: Ksenia Baybakova

Front office
 General manager: Vladimir Golubovich
 Sports director: Yelena Guslistaya
 Manager of Hockey Operations: Anton Kolesnikov
 President: Sergei Kolotnev

Team captaincy history 
 Alyona Khomich, 2009–2011
 Alexandra Kapustina, 2011–2015
 Maria Pechnikova, 2015–2017
 Anastasia Smirnova, 2017–18
 Alexandra Kapustina, 2018–19
 Anna Shchukina, 2019–20
 Angelina Goncharenko, 2020–present

Head coaches 
 Georgi Yevtyukhin, 2008–09 (replaced mid-season)
 Yevgeni Bobariko, 2008–09 (promoted mid-season from assistant coach)
 Oleg Namestnikov, 2014 (promoted mid-season from assistant coach)–2016
 Vladimir Golubovich, 2017–2019
 Sergei Filin, 2019–20
 Vladimir Golubovich, 2020–21
Igor Averkin, 2021–

Notable alumni 
Years active with SKIF listed alongside player name.
 Yelena Byalkovskaya, 1996–2004
 Maria Belova, 2010–2020
 Alexandra Kapustina, 2008–2015
 Lidiya Malyavko, 2019–2021
 Larisa Mishina, 1995–2004
 Olga Semenets, 2008–2019
 Yelena Silina, 2003–2020
 Violetta Simanova, 1995–2004
 Anastasia Smirnova, 2007–2020
 Olga Sosina, 2008–2015
 Larisa Teplygina, 1996–2015
 Svetlana Trefilova, 1995–2000
 Oxana Tretyakova, 2003–2012
 Tatyana Tsaryova, 1995–2000
 Viktoria Volobuyeva, 1996–2005
 Lyudmila Yurlova, 1995–2008

International players
 Tatyana Chizhova, 2016–2020
 Jenni Hiirikoski, 2008–09 & 2011–12
 Alexandra Huszák, 2015–16
 Mira Jalosuo, 2013–2015
 Franciska Kiss-Simon, 2015–2018
 Kati Kovalainen, 2007–2009
 Karoliina Rantamäki, 2007–2019
 Meeri Räisänen, 2014–15
 Noora Räty, 2013–14
 Nora Tallus, 2007–08
 Emma Terho, 2007–08
 Anna Vanhatalo, 2010–11
 Marjo Voutilainen, 2008–09

European Women’s Cup Champion rosters

2009 European Women's Champions
The SKIF Nizhny Novgorod roster that won the 2009 European Women's Champions Cup.

Goaltenders: Nadezhda Alexandrova, Alyona Kropachyova
Defencemen: Jenni Hiirikoski, Alexandra Kapustina, Alyona Khomich, Kati Kovalainen, Viktoria Samarina, Anna Shchukina, Larisa Teplygina
Forwards: Yulia Deulina, Yelena Guslistaya, Karoliina Rantamäki, Olga Semenets, Yelena Silina, Olga Sosina, Tatiana Sotnikova, Svetlana Terentieva, Svetlana Tkacheva, Oksana Vitalyevna Tretyakova, Marjo Voutilainen
Head coach: Yevgeni Bobariko
Assistant coach: Georgy Evtyukhin

2015 European Women's Champions 
The SKIF Nizhny Novgorod roster that won the 2015 European Women's Champions Cup.

 Goaltenders: Irina Gashennikova, Meeri Räisänen
 Defencemen: Maria Bodrikova, Mira Jalosuo, Alexandra Kapustina (C), Maria Pechnikova, Anastasia Smirnova, Larisa Teplygina
 Forwards: Maria Belova, Landysh Falyakhova, Yekaterina Likhachyova, Maria Nadezhdina,  Alsu Rakhimova, Karoliina Rantamäki, Olga Semenets (A), Nadezhda Shiryayeva, Yelena Silina (A), Olga Sosina, Anna Timofeyeva
 Head coach: Oleg Namestnikov
 Assistant coach: Alexei Kurilov

References 
Content in this edit is translated from the existing German Wikipedia article at :de:SKIF Nischni Nowgorod; see its history for attribution.

External links
 Official site 
Team information and statistics from Eliteprospects.com, and Eurohockey.com, and Hockeyarchives.info

Sport in Nizhny Novgorod
Ice hockey teams in Russia
Zhenskaya Hockey League teams